Selwyn County is one of the 141 Cadastral divisions of New South Wales. It is located to the east of the Murray River, with part of the Tumut River as its boundary to the north-east. It includes Mount Kosciuszko, the highest mountain in Australia.

Selwyn County was named in honour of geologist Alfred Richard Cecil Selwyn (1824–1902).

Parishes within this county

A full list of parishes found within this county. After the local government mergers of 2016, all parishes of Selwyn County are in the Snowy Valleys Council.

References

Counties of New South Wales